Entertainment Network India Limited (ENIL) is a subsidiary of Times Infotainment Media Limited, the holding company promoted by Bennett, Coleman & Company Limited- the flagship company of the Times of India Group, was incorporated in 1999.

Times Infotainment is promoted by Bennett, Coleman & Company Limited, better known as the Times of India Group, which was incorporated in 1999. ENIL is the only listed company in the otherwise privately held Times of India Group. It is listed on Bombay Stock Exchange of India Limited and the National Stock Exchange of India Limited.

History

The company was formed in June 1999 post the first phase of licensing. The Information Broadcasting Ministry offered 108 frequency across 40 cities and ENIL got the maximum of them. It started its operations with the launch of its services in Indore on 4 October 2001. The company simultaneously started operations in seven more cities. In the second phase the company got 25 more frequencies. That took the count of total number of stations to 32.

Brand Mirchi and "Its Hot!" the tag line

The tag line of the brand is "Its Hot!" Mirchi is a Hindi word for chilly. While all other radio brands were in English, ENIL came up with a Hindi brand name. The brand name Mirchi was coined by Mr. Vineet Jain (Chairman, Times Group).

Business segment

ENIL cater to Radio Broadcasting Segment, Out of Home and Experiential Marketing Segment

Radio broadcasting segment

This segment operates with the brand name of 'Radio Mirchi'. Before Radio Mirchi, the Times of India Group provided private FM service along with the Government of India under the brand name of Times FM. GOI did not renew the contract with private player post that. They operated in Delhi, Calcutta, Chennai and Goa from 1993-1998. It has been consistently rated as the No. 1 FM radio channel. It has a large pan India presence with 32 stations across 14 states. The channel reaches to more than 41 Million listeners (as per IRS Q4, 2010, last week recall) across stations.

Experiential marketing segment

Experiential marketing segment is carried under the brand name 360 Degree. Alternative Brand Solution (India) Limited, a subsidiary of ENIL, is the organisation which looks after this segment. They have organised many popular event properties. One of them being Spell Bee - India Spells. This year was the third edition of the event, and they engaged with more than three lakh across 25 cities.

Out of Home
This segment provides Digital Screens, Large Formats, Street Furniture etc. They won a 20-year advertising contract with New Delhi Airport, Terminal 3.

Financials

Digital innovations

 ENIL with tie up with Bharti Airtel ltd have launched Mirchi Mobile. Under this service Airtel customers could tune into Radio Mirchi channels of different cities. This service allowed customers to tune into 12 stations of Radio Mirchi. This service was later extended to Reliance and BSNL customers also.
 Radio Mirchi can also be heard online.

Highlights of advertising business of FM radio
 Top three categories to advertise on FM Radio - Real Estate, Cellular Service Providers, TV Channel Promotion
 40% of business comes from local advertisers

References

Companies of The Times Group
Companies based in Mumbai
Indian companies established in 1999
1999 establishments in Maharashtra
Mass media companies established in 1999
Companies listed on the Bombay Stock Exchange